The Phoenix Industries CV1 ParaFlyer is an American powered parachute that was designed and produced by Phoenix Industries of Southampton, New Jersey. Now out of production, when it was available the aircraft was supplied as a complete ready-to-fly-aircraft.

Design and development
It features a parachute-style wing that was available in two sizes, single-place accommodation, tricycle landing gear and a single  Zenoah G-25 engine in pusher configuration.

The CV1 ParaFlyer carriage is built from metal tubing. In flight steering is accomplished via handles that actuate the canopy brakes, creating roll and yaw. On the ground the aircraft has nosewheel steering.

The aircraft can be folded down small enough to fit into the trunk of some cars or to be carried on a specially-designed bumper carrier.

Specifications (CV1 ParaFlyer)

References

1990s United States ultralight aircraft
Single-engined pusher aircraft
Powered parachutes
Phoenix Industries aircraft